Baldangiin Sanjaa (born 9 April 1937) is a Mongolian wrestler. He competed in the men's freestyle featherweight at the 1964 Summer Olympics.

References

1937 births
Living people
Mongolian male sport wrestlers
Olympic wrestlers of Mongolia
Wrestlers at the 1964 Summer Olympics
Place of birth missing (living people)